The Gainsborough Academy is a secondary school with academy status located in Gainsborough, Lincolnshire, England. The academy has specialisms in technology and performing arts.

It opened as Trent Valley Academy on 1 September 2008. It is a mainstream (11-16) school created by the merger of two existing secondary schools, Castle Hills and Middlefield School. The two predecessor sites are now closed, and a new purpose-built facility has been built on Corringham Road, Gainsborough. The construction project has produced a four-storey, 15,000-square-metre building on a 12-hectare site. This was the first new school built in Lincolnshire in over 40 years, and budgeted at £23 million, with a final cost of around £40 million.

It was established by the lead sponsor E-ACT (EduTrust Academies Charitable Trust) in partnership with the local community Gainsborough Educational Village Trust. It was officially opened in June 2010 by the Duke of Gloucester.

In 2014 it was announced that following serious concerns being raised by Ofsted inspectors about its performance, the school would be put under a new sponsor. On 1 June 2014, the Academy became the Gainsborough Academy, under the sponsorship of the main local provider of further education, Lincoln College, and became part of the Lincoln College Group.

Having received an 'inadequate' grade from Ofsted and being put in special measures in December 2016, Gainsborough Academy changed sponsor again and moved to Wickersley Partnership Trust, its third sponsor in less than a decade, on 1 June 2018.

References

External links
 The Gainsborough Academy official website
 Gainsborough Standard

Secondary schools in Lincolnshire
2008 establishments in England
Academies in Lincolnshire
Educational institutions established in 2008
Gainsborough, Lincolnshire